Obadiah is a masculine given name. It is of Biblical Hebrew origin, and its popularity derives from Obadiah, a prophet in the Hebrew Bible and in the religious traditions of Christianity, Judaism, and Islam.

Etymology 
Obadiah ( – ʿŌḇaḏyā or  – ʿŌḇaḏyāhū; "servant of Yah") is a biblical theophorical name, meaning "servant or slave of Yahweh" or "worshiper of Yahweh." The Greek form of the name used in the Septuagint is Obdios. In Latin it is translated as Abdias while in Arabic it is either ʿAbdullah, Ubaydah, or Ubaidullah "Slave of God". The Bishops' Bible refers to the prophet with this name as Abdi. The name is related to "Abdeel", "servant of God", which is also cognate to the Arabic name "Abdullah" or "Obaidullah". The equivalent Turkish name is Abdil or Abdi.

Biblical figures

 
Obadiah (1 Kings), head of King Ahab's household who announces the return of Elijah According to the rabbinic tradition, the tradition of the Eastern Orthodox and Oriental Orthodox Churches, this is the same individual as the prophet.
 the son of Hananiah, a descendant of king David of Israel through Solomon
 the son of Uzzi, a descendant of the Hebrew patriarch Issachar
 the son of Azel, a descendant of King Saul of Israel through Jonathan
 the son of Shemaiah, a descendant of the Hebrew patriarch Levi
 a warrior of the Tribe of Gad who served King David
 the father of Ishmaiah, governor of the tribe of Zebulun during the reign of King David
 a prince of the southern kingdom of Judah during the reign of King Jehoshaphat
 a Levite, overseer of the reconstruction efforts during the reforms of King Josiah of Judah
 the son of Joab, one of the individuals who returned from the Babylonian captivity with the priestly scribe Ezra, and possibly the Levite mentioned in Nehemiah 12:25 as a porter of Jerusalem's gates after the city's reconstruction under Nehemiah

People

Pre-17th century
Ordered chronologically.
 Obadiah (Khazar), late eighth or early ninth century Khazar ruler
 Obadiah the Proselyte, early-12th-century Italian convert to Judaism, writer and musician
 Obadiah of Bertinoro (c. 1450?–c. 1516 or earlier), Italian rabbi best known for his popular commentary on the Mishnah
 Obadiah ben Jacob Sforno (c. 1475–1550), Italian rabbi, Biblical commentator, philosopher and physician

17th century to the present
Ordered alphabetically.
 Obadiah Bowne (1822–1874), American politician
 Obadiah Bruen Brown (1779–1852), American Baptist clergyman, Chaplain of the House and Chaplain of the Senate
 Obadiah Bull, said to have been Irish lawyer who practised in London during the reign of Henry VII (1485–1509) and allegedly inspiration for the expression "That's a Bull"
 Obadiah Bush (1797–1851), American prospector and businessman, an ancestor of the Bush political family
 Obadiah Carter (1925–1994), American musician, member of the "5" Royales R&B group
 Obadiah Elliott (1763–1838), British inventor
 Obadiah Gardner (1852–1938), American politician, US Senator from Maine
 Obadiah German (1766–1842), American lawyer and politician, US Senator from New York
 Obadiah Grew (1607–1689), English nonconformist minister
 Obadiah Holmes (1610–1682), early Rhode Island settler and Baptist minister whipped for his religious beliefs and activism
 Obadiah Hughes (1695–1751), English Presbyterian minister
 Obadiah Johnson (1849–1920), author and the second Nigerian to qualify as a medical doctor
 Obadiah Kariuki (1902–1978), Kenyan Anglican bishop
 Obadiah Moyo, Zimbabwean politician and former hospital administrator, disgraced ex-Minister of Health and Child Care (2018–2020)
 Obadiah Newnham (1848–1932), Anglican Archdeacon of Fredericton, Canada
 Obadiah Rich (1777–1850), American diplomat, bibliophile and bibliographer
 Obadiah Short (1803–1886), British amateur landscape painter
 Obadiah Shuttleworth (died 1734), English composer, violinist and organist
 Obadiah Tarumbwa (born 1985), Zimbabwean footballer
 Obadiah Titus (1789–1854), American politician
 Obi Toppin (born 1998), American National Basketball Association player
 Obadiah Wheelock (1738–1807), Nova Scotia politician
 Obadiah Wills (1625–?), English clergyman, theologian and paedobaptist who critiqued John Bunyan's position on baptism

Fictional characters
 Obadiah Archer, a superhero in the Valiant Comics universe
 Obadiah Hakeswill, in the Richard Sharpe series of novels and films
 Obadiah Elihue Parker, protagonist of the Flannery O'Connor short story "Parker's Back"
 Obadiah Slope, in Anthony Trollope's novel Barchester Towers
 Obadiah Stane, main antagonist of the 2008 film Iron Man, played by Jeff Bridges
 Obadiah Tarumbwa, in the British soap opera Emmerdale

References 

English masculine given names
Hebrew-language names
Masculine given names
Modern names of Hebrew origin
Given names of Hebrew language origin
Theophoric names